Mimasura is a genus of moths of the family Noctuidae. The genus was erected by George Hampson in 1910.

Species
 Mimasura albiceris Turner, 1903
 Mimasura asticta Hampson, 1910
 Mimasura clara Holland, 1893
 Mimasura disticta Hampson, 1910
 Mimasura impuncta Hampson, 1910
 Mimasura innotata Hampson, 1910
 Mimasura miltochristodes Hampson, 1918
 Mimasura pseudopyralis Berio, 1937
 Mimasura quadripuncta Hampson, 1910
 Mimasura simplex Rebel, 1907
 Mimasura strigicostalis Hampson, 1910
 Mimasura tripunctoides Poole, 1989
 Mimasura unipuncta Hampson, 1902

References

Acontiinae